Smim Maru (or ; d. 1384) was a general of the Royal Hanthawaddy Army, and a pretender to the Hanthawaddy throne. Son of a court official, Maru rose to the upper echelons of the Hanthawaddy court by marrying Princess Tala Mi Thiri. He then became a close ally and alleged lover of Princess-Regent Maha Dewi. He was executed on the order of his brother-in-law King Razadarit in 1384.

Brief
Maru was not a royal but a son of a senior court official and a military commander. Maru apparently become a wealthy man by the early 1370s when he asked for the hand of Princess Tala Mi Thiri, daughter of King Binnya U. (She had just returned from Chiang Mai after a divorce from King Kue Na of Lan Na.) He is said to have offered five viss (8.16 kg) of gold in dowry. Thiri's father King Binnya U had fond memories of Maru's father, who had died in action in his service, and gave his permission. A seven-day lavish wedding between Maru and the princess followed.

Though not a military man, Maru then became a commander in the army. He was the second-in-command of the army that defeated the rebellion of Gov. Than-Byat of Syriam. The operation was orchestrated by Princess Maha Dewi, the elder sister of the king. In the following years, he became an ally of the powerful princess. According to the chronicle Razadarit Ayedawbon, three years after his marriage to Thiri, he became involved with the princess, now in her 50s. The princess gained power over the following years as her brother's health deteriorated. A key faction the Pegu court led by Chief Minister Zeik-Bye opposed the Maha Dewi–Maru faction, and they tried to undermine Maha Dewi's influence by publicizing the affair. At any rate, the Maha Dewi–Maru faction was firmly in power by the early 1380s. By 1382, she was the de facto ruler.

Maru's end came in late 1383. In October, Maha Dewi, now in her official capacity as princess regent asked Maru and Zeik-Byet to lead the Pegu army to put down Prince Binnya Nwe's rebellion at Dagon. However, Zeik-Bye secretly supported Nwe's rebellion, and provided intelligence to Nwe's camp. On 19 November, Maru's vanguard force was driven back. After Binnya U's death on 2 January 1384, Maru tried to rally the court to put him on the throne. When he found no support, he and his wife tried to flee. But they were both captured. On 5 January 1384, Binnya Nwe, who became king the day before, ordered Maru's immediate execution right before proceeding to his coronation ceremony. (Maru's wife Thiri apparently escaped the execution. The chronicle does not say that the new king, who was about to take the title Razadarit, ordered the execution of his half-sister.)

Notes

References

Bibliography
 
 

Hanthawaddy dynasty
Burmese generals